The 2019 Cincinnati Bearcats football team represented the University of Cincinnati in the 2019 NCAA Division I FBS football season. The Bearcats played their home games at Nippert Stadium, and competed as members of the East Division in the American Athletic Conference. They were led by third-year head coach Luke Fickell.

Previous season 
In 2018, the Bearcats finished with an 11–2 (6–2 AAC) record, and won the Military Bowl against Virginia Tech. The 11 win season was only the third such season in the history of the program. This was Cincinnati's first bowl game since the 2015 season and the first bowl win since the 2012 season.

Recruits

The Bearcats signed a total of 16 recruits, including three transfers.

Incoming transfers
Cincinnati added six transfers to the 2019 roster.

Preseason

Award watch lists

AAC media poll
The AAC media poll was released on July 16, 2019, with the Bearcats predicted to finish second in the AAC East Division.

Schedule 
The Bearcats' 2019 schedule consisted of six home games and six away games. Cincinnati hosted two of its four non-conference games; against UCLA from the Pac-12 Conference, and Miami (OH) from the Mid-American Conference for their annual Victory Bell game. They travelled to instate rival Ohio State for their first meeting with the Buckeyes since 2014, and to Marshall.

The Bearcats played eight conference games; hosting Temple, Tulsa, UCF, and UConn. They travelled to South Florida, East Carolina, Houston, and Memphis.

Game summaries

UCLA 

The Bearcats kicked off the 2019 season before a raucous near capacity crowd at Nippert Stadium and a national TV audience, and like their previous meeting against the visitors from the Pac-12 dominated the game after a slow start. Sophomore QB Desmond Ridder was an efficient 18–26 from 242 yards while Junior RB Michael Warren II had 92 yards on 26 carries as the Bearcats defeated the Bruins 24–14. Both teams showed opening day rust and jitters combining for 19 penalties. The Bruins nearly flipped the game momentum when Ridder threw an interception near the goal line late in the first half, CB Jay Shaw raced 60 yards with the pass before Josiah Deguara heroically shed several blockers to make the tackle. The Bruins were flagged for a pair of unsportsmanlike conduct penalties and did not score off the turnover as the half ended. Warren scored a pair of touchdowns one on a run the other on a pass to keep the Bearcats comfortably in the lead. The win was the 2nd in the series and completed a 2-year sweep of the Bruins in football and basketball. The Bearcats men's basketball team logged wins over the Bruins in Dec 2017 in Los Angeles and in 2018 in the newly renovated Fifth Third Arena.

at Ohio State 

Unlike their 2014 meeting, the Bearcats were never in their meeting with the 5th ranked Ohio State. Ohio State QB Justin Fields threw for 2 scores, ran for an additional 2 scores and Ohio State blew out the Bearcats 42–0, their first shutout loss since 2005. The Bearcats had pitched 6 shutouts in the span of being blanked themselves

Miami (OH) 

The Bearcats shook off a slow start and after spotting Miami 10 1st quarter points, scored 35 points in the 2nd and 3rd quarter to roar back to a 35–13 win. The Bearcats scored on four of five possessions in a span of the 2nd and 3rd quarters to rally then break the game open. Michael Warren rushed for 113 yards and 3 scores including a breathtaking 73 yard run as he made a number of nifty cutbacks and jukes before sprinting untouched the last 40 yards. Desmond Ridder threw for 186 yards and a pair of touchdowns both of which came on beautiful lead throws to his receivers. The win ensured the Victory Bell stays in Cincinnati for the 14th straight year, the longest run in the series which dates back to 1888 and is the oldest collegiate football rivalry west of the Alleghenies.

at Marshall 

Shaking off their reputation for slow starts the Bearcats scored the game's first 45 points en route to a 52–14 blasting of Marshall in front of a sullen crowd in Huntington, W Va. The Bearcats were rude guests, scoring on each of their first four drives. Desmond Ridder threw for four scores. Marshall was limited to 256 yards of offense, with half of that coming in the fourth.

UCF

In front of a frenzied, black-clad crowd of 40,121 (which included a record 7,825 UC students), the Bearcats upset the 18th ranked Knights and avenged a pair of lopsided defeats from the previous two seasons. The Bearcats forced 4 turnovers, limited UCF to 3.0 yards per carry, and held the high-powered Knights offense under 30 points for the first time in 31 games (which was an FBS record). The win also snapped the Knights' 19-game conference win streak. The Bearcats and Knights traded scores in the 1st half and the Knights held a 16–10 lead at halftime. The Bearcats closed the gap to 16–13 on a Sam Crosa field goal. Sauce Gardner picked off a Dillon Gabriel pass and raced 16 yards with the stolen loaf to give the Bearcats a lead they would never relinquish. After extending their lead to 11 with Desmond Ridder's scoring strike to Alec Pierce, the Knights fought back to close the game to 3 with a 45-yard pass from Gabriel to Nixon. The Knights would not get the ball back as the Bearcats would recover the Knights' onside kick attempt and then converted a 4th and inches to ice the game. The Bearcats earned their first home win over a ranked opponent since 2009 (West Virginia) and their first win over a ranked team since 2012 (Virginia Tech), having lost their last 6 attempts. The win moved the Bearcats into 1st place in the AAC East and earned the Bearcats a Top 25 ranking at 25.

at Houston 

On the road now as a ranked team (#25), the Bearcats traveled to Houston to face the Cougars. Taking advantage of five turnovers that led to 21 points, The Bearcats led all the way to a 38–23 win and improved to 2–0 in conference play. Big plays were the watchword of the day played under a sunny sky in Houston. Desmond Ridder scrambled 13 yards for the opening score, then found Rashad Medaris streaking downfield for a 75-yard score. After the Cougars cut the Bearcat lead to four with a long touchdown pass of their own, Ridder found Josiah Deguara with a short pass that the senior tight end took into the end zone to give the Bearcats a 21–10 halftime lead. The Cougars again cut the lead to 4 with a 3rd quarter scoring strike, a 69-yard pass from the second of four different quarterbacks the Cougars employed on the day. Michael Warren II took a screen pass from Ridder and pinballed his way to the end zone on an 11-yard TD to open the 4th quarter scoring and give the Bearcats a 28–17 lead. The Cougars answered with their own score but failed on the two-point conversion to close back to 5. After a Sam Crosa field goal increased the Bearcat lead to 8, the Cougars got the ball back needing a touchdown and two-point conversion to tie the score. The Cougars started their drive inside their own 20 and Clayton Tune's 3rd down pass was batted by Malik Vann with Perry Young corralling the ricochet and waltzing into the end zone from 2 yards out for the clinching touchdown. A final Cougar drive was also snuffed out with an end zone interception by Coby Bryant.

Tulsa 

Returning home with #21 ranking, the Bearcats hosted the Golden Hurricane. Gerrid Doaks scored three times as he filled in for Michael Warren II who was hampered by nagging injuries and held to 35 yards rushing. Despite being outgained 377–317 in total yardage, the Bearcats led all the way in a 24–13 win. Doaks, who had not seen the end zone since 2017, scored his first touchdown in the 1st quarter on a 4-yard run after the Bearcats opened the scoring with a 50-yard field goal. Trailing 10–0 in the 2nd quarter, the Golden Hurricane got on the board after a bizarre series of events: the Bearcats had forced the Golden Hurricane to punt and partially blocked it, but the ball ricocheted off a Bearcat player 10 yards downfield which Tulsa recovered and went on to score 5 plays later. The Bearcats led  10–7 at the half. The Bearcats increased their lead back to 10 on Doaks' second score of the day, a short pass from Desmond Ridder in which Doaks broke several tackles on his way to diving for the pylon. The Golden Hurricane got as close as 4 on a pair of field goals, the latter early in the 4th quarter. After forcing a turnover deep in their own territory, the Bearcats drove 80 yards but turned the ball over on downs at the Tulsa 10. With a chance to take the lead, Darrick Forrest intercepted Zach Smith and returned the ball to the Tulsa 27. The interception was the 5th forced by the Bearcats defense on the afternoon. Doaks then delivered the back breaker with a nearly untouched 27 yard sprint to the end zone for his third touchdown of the day to put the Bearcats back up by 11. Doaks finished with 91 yards on 17 carries and 2 TDs. The win was the Bearcats' 11th consecutive win at Nippert, with only a 17-game home win streak by the 2008–2012 teams being longer. The win also made the Bearcats bowl eligible for the 2nd straight year.

at East Carolina 

After a bye week, the #17 ranked Bearcats headed on the road to face East Carolina, a team that they beat 56–6 in their previous meeting to end the 2018 regular season. Entering the game as heavy favorites, the Bearcats found themselves in a serious fight to remain unbeaten in conference play.  The Bearcats opening the scoring with a short TD run by Michael Warren II, only to have the Pirates answer with a 75-yard touchdown pass from Holton Ahlers to CJ Johnson. The Bearcats answered that score with a long pass from Desmond Ridder to Josiah Deguara that covered 73 yards and Gerrid Doaks scoring from 2 yards out. The back and forth scoring continued with the Bearcats and Pirates trading scores and UC leading 21–14 after one quarter. ECU then scored 17 unanswered points to take a 31–21 lead into the half. The Bearcats responded with a solid drive to open the 2nd half, with Warren scoring his third TD of the game. The Pirates added another touchdown late in the 3rd to build their biggest lead at 40–28. The Bearcats battled back, cutting the lead to 5 with a touchdown pass from Ridder to Deguara. The biggest play of the game came from the much-maligned defense—with the Pirates pushing into Bearcats territory for a potential backbreaking score, Sauce Gardner intercepted a short out route pass and raced 62 yards with the stolen loaf for a momentum turning touchdown. The pick-6 gave the Bearcats a 43–40 lead after a Ridder to Deguara 2-point conversion. The Pirates did not go quietly, grinding a 9-play 65-yard drive ending in a Jake Verity 27-yard field goal. With good field position due to a poor kickoff by Verity, UC's Ridder raced 30 yards on the first play, and a trio of short passes to Malick Mbodj got the Bearcats to the ECU 16-yard line. Sam Crosa nailed a 32-yard field goal with no time left to win the game. The Bearcats got the win despite being outgained (638–462), giving up 35 first downs, and having a nearly 10 min deficit in time of possession. The win kept the Bearcats unbeaten in conference play.

UConn 

The #17 Bearcats (#20 CFP rankings) hosted Connecticut on a chilly, but sunny, homecoming Saturday. The Bearcats dominated the game from the start, driving the length of the field after holding the Huskies to a three-and-out on their initial drive. Desmond Ridder found Josiah Deguara in the middle of the end zone for the score. Michael Warren II scored on a 6-yard run on the Bearcats' second drive to build a 14–0 lead. The Bearcats scored 24 points in the second quarter with a field goal from Cole Smith, a short TD run by Gerrid Doaks, and a second score from Warren. Ridder added a second touchdown pass to Deguara on a slick fade pattern to make it 38–0 at the half.  After playing one series in the 3rd quarter, the starters were done for the day. The rout gave Bearcats head coach Luke Fickell a chance to use a majority of reserve players in the 2nd half, providing valuable game experience. Ryan Montgomery crashed into the end zone early in the 4th to make it 48–0. UConn spoiled the shutout bid with a late field goal but the 48–3 win gave the Bearcats a 13–3 edge in the all-time series and kept them perfect at 10–0 all-time at home against UConn. Desmond Ridder passed for 136 yards and a pair of touchdowns. Gerrid Doaks rushed for 123 yard and a score. The Bearcats dominated statistically gaining over 500 yards for the second straight week and 307 yards rushing. The defense allowed 218 yards total offense and 70 yards passing, a stark contrast to the 535 given up in the week previous. The 7th win matched the longest winning streak since 2014 and kept the Bearcats unbeaten in conference play. The Bearcats also extended their home win streak to 12 dating back to November 2017. Combined with the loss by UCF to Tulsa earlier in the day, the win clinched no worse than a tie for the American Eastern Division.

at South Florida 

The 17th ranked Bearcats headed on the road to face South Florida in Tampa. Twice rallying back from 10 point deficits, the Bearcats again were walk-off winners with a tense 20–17 win. The Bearcats offense started sluggish and let the Bulls dominate the first half. The Bulls got on the board with a 4-yard run from Trevon Sands in the first quarter and extended their lead to 10 with a Spencer Shrader field goal. In the second half the Bearcats got on the board with a short TD run from Gerrid Doaks. The Bulls extended their lead back to 10 with a short TD pass from Bulls QB Jordan McCloud to Mitchell Wilcox. The Bearcats cut the deficit back to 7 with a 41-yard field goal from Sam Crosa. In the 4th quarter, the Bearcats tied the game with a 4-yard touchdown run from Michael Warren II. After a series of possessions with no scoring, the Bulls went on a 13-play, 82-yard drive and Shrader lined up for a 33-yard field but his attempt was no good, bouncing off the upright. Given a reprieve, the Bearcats raced back down the field and Crosa nailed a 37-yard field goal as the clock expired, giving the Bearcats their first lead of the game. The win kept the Bearcats unbeaten in conference and extended their winning streak to 8 games.

Temple 

The 17th ranked (19th in CFP poll) Bearcats took the field against Temple in the regular season home finale for Senior Night. On a raw, rainy night, the Bearcats battled the Owls in an attempt to clinch their first AAC divisional title. After a scoreless first quarter, the Bearcats took the lead on a short field goal by Sam Crosa. The Bearcats squandered a chance to go up 10 after Temple punter Adam Barry knelt to field a low punt snap and was ruled down at the Temple 6-yard line. The Bearcats failed to move the ball (actually losing 14 yards) and settled for a second Crosa field goal to double their lead going into the half. Taking the 2nd half kickoff, the Bearcats put together their best drive of the game. Taking advantage of the kickoff going out of bounds, the Bearcats drove 65 yards in 9 plays, highlighted by an 18-yard run by Michael Warren II and a 14-yard scamper by Gerrid Doaks. Warren finished the drive with a 13-yard TD run. Temple got onto the board with a 10-play 73-yard drive with Re'Mahn Davis scoring on 7-yard run. The Bearcats, however, blocked the extra point attempt, and Coby Bryant scooped up the ball and raced 98 yards for 2 points making the score 15–6. This would be the score that would prove critical later in the game. The Bearcats punted on the subsequent drive and The Owls again put together a lengthy drive and again scored a touchdown with Temple QB Anthony Russo connecting with TE Kenny Yeboah on a 16-yard scoring strike to cut the lead to 15–13. Trying to ride out the clock, the Bearcats went on a 10-play 42-yard drive highlighted by a 17-yard run by Warren. The drive stalled and Crosa missed a 40-yard field goal. Taking over with one time-out and needing at 45 yards to get into field goal range, the Owls tried a last desperate drive, but 4 plays later Darrick Forrest picked off a deep pass attempt by Russo to seal the game. The Bearcats won their 3rd game when being outgained in yardage (310–210) . The Bearcats broke a 4-game losing streak to Temple, completed their 2nd consecutive perfect home schedule and extended their home winning streak to 13.

at Memphis 

The 17th ranked (19th in CFP) Bearcats took the field the day after Thanksgiving to battle the 18th ranked Tigers in Memphis. The game was nationally televised on ABC and got off to an inauspicious start for the Bearcats as the kickoff was run back 94 yards by Chris Claybrooks for a Memphis touchdown. The Bearcats would be without the services of Desmond Ridder whose chronic shoulder troubles continued to haunt him. Redshirt freshman Ben Bryant would get the start in Ridder's place and the Bearcat offense struggled to move consistently in the 1st quarter. After getting an opening drive field goal, the Bearcat defense allowed a long Memphis drive which ended in another touchdown, with Kederian Jones on the receiving end of a Brady White pass. Trailing 17–3, the Bearcats drove the length of the field at the start of the 2nd quarter and Bryant found TE Leonard Taylor for a 4-yard touchdown pass. Michael Warren II scored from 4 yards out with 2:54 to play in the half and the Bearcats had erased the deficit. Memphis responded with a short field goal to lead 20–17 at the half. After a scoreless 3rd quarter, the Tigers were on the move and had the ball just inside Bearcat territory when they ran a reverse flea-flicker for a 46-yard touchdown pass from White to Demonte Coxie that boosted the Tiger lead back to 10. The Bearcats cut the deficit back to 3 on a 12-yard touchdown scramble by Bryant, but the Tigers ground out another long drive aided by a costly unsportsmanlike conduct penalty on Myjai Sanders on what should have been a 3rd down stop. The Tigers Antonio Gibson raced in from 29 yards out three plays later, re-extending the Tigers lead to 10. The Bearcats last gasp was snuffed out with an interception, ending the Bearcats' 9-game winning streak. The win clinched the AAC West for the Tigers and gave them home field advantage for the AAC Championship game. Michael Warren rushed for 122 yards and a touchdown, putting him over 1000 yards rushing for the 2nd consecutive season.

at Memphis (AAC Championship Game)

The 20th ranked Bearcats were making their first appearance in the AAC title game, seeking their first American title since 2014 when they shared the crown with Memphis & Central Florida (The American Championship game was first played in 2015). The Tigers won the toss and deferred to the 2nd half, but attempted an onside kick on the opening kickoff. The Bearcats alertly called for a fair catch on the kick and were able to keep the ball even though the return man fumbled the kick and Memphis recovered. With the free kick catch penalty leveled on the Tigers the Bearcats started with the ball deep in Tiger territory. Michael Warren II opened the scoring with a 6-yard run. Memphis answered with a pair of scores, the second being a 65-yard run by RB Antonio Gibson. The Tigers had a 10–7 lead at the end of the first quarter. The Bearcats capped off a 7-play 80-yard drive with a 15-yard run by Desmond Ridder who return to the starting lineup after missing a game. The Bearcats took lead into halftime. The Tigers went 75 yards on the 2nd half kickoff and Memphis QB Brady White later scored from a yard out. Michael Warren crashed in from a yard out on the ensuing drive which covered 9 plays and 75 yards. Riley Patterson validated his 1st team all-AAC selection by booming a 52-yard field goal and heading into the final quarter, the Bearcats held a narrow 21–20 lead. Patterson nailed his 2nd 50-yard field goal 13 seconds into the 4th and the Tigers took back the lead. After a Sam Crosa 33-yard field goal, the Tigers marched back down the field and with 1:14 left in the game, the Tigers put the 8th lead change on the board with a White to Gibson TD pass. The game had seen everything but an ending, as the Bearcats raced back downfield without the benefit of a timeout. The last gasp drive stalled at the Tiger 25 with Ridder misfiring on his last four passes. The Bearcats with the loss fell to 10–3, but accepted a bid to the Birmingham Bowl to be played on January 2 against Boston College.

vs. Boston College (Birmingham Bowl)

Playing in only their fourth January Bowl Game, the 21st Ranked Bearcats traveled to Birmingham to face Boston College from the ACC in the Ticketsmarter Birmingham Bowl. This would be the second time that the Bearcats had played a bowl game in this venue, having beaten Southern Mississippi in the 2007 Papa John's Bowl. The Bearcats dominated the game from start to finish and finished their season on a victorious note as they routed the Eagles 38–6 to notch their biggest bowl game victory margin in their bowl history.
Played under cloudy threatening skies, the Eagles came into the game doubly hampered as head coach Steve Addazio had been fired before accepting the bowl bid and wide receivers coach Rich Gunnell would be interim head coach with newly hired Jeff Hafley on hand only as an observer. Star RB AJ Dillon declared for the NFL draft and announced that he would skip the bowl game. The Bearcats seniors were led by LB Perry Young, a Birmingham native who would be playing his final game in front of his hometown crowd.
The Bearcats and Eagles played tentatively at the start, which was played under a steady downpour and then delayed as lightning was detected in the area. After a 92-minute delay the teams returned to the field and the Bearcats broke into the scoring column with a 13-yard run by Desmond Ridder. BC put together its best drive but Aaron Bouhmerhi's 40-yard field goal attempt was blocked. That would forebode many of the Eagles offensive struggles. The Bearcats took possession after the miss and drove downfield resulting in a Sam Crosa 32-yard field goal to increase the Bearcat lead to 10–0. The Eagles continued to struggle against the stout Bearcat defense. Two plays into the subsequent BC drive, Eagle QB Dennis Grosel was sacked by Ethan Tucky and fumbled the ball. Bryan Wright recovered the fumble and the Bearcats were in excellent scoring position at the BC 19. After a BC penalty, Ridder notched his second rushing touchdown of the day with a 14-yard scamper. The Bearcats took a 17–0 lead into the half.
The Bearcats opened the 2nd half with a punishing 12-play 75-yard drive that ate nearly 6 minutes off the clock. Ridder found Malick Mbodj, who made an excellent one-handed TD grab, to increase the lead to 24–0. The Eagles again went three-and-out and the Bearcats' next drive stalled at the BC 26 yard line. Long distance field goal specialist Cole Smith was called on to try a 43-yard field goal, but the kick was blocked by BC's Mike Palmer and Brandon Sebastian picked up the loose ball and raced 65 yards the other way for an Eagles' touchdown. BC attempted a two-point conversion, but the pass was incomplete. 
The Bearcats produced another long drive that spanned the end of the 3rd quarter and the beginning of the 4th. Early in the 4th, Ridder romped into the end zone for his third TD of the game and gave the Bearcats a commanding 31–6 lead. Bearcats head coach Luke Fickell cleared the bench and got many players some bowl experience. Ryan Montgomery capped the Bearcats final drive with a touchdown from a yard out with under a minute to go to make the final score 38–6. The 32 point victory margin was the largest in a bowl game since the 1947 Bearcats defeated Virginia Tech 33–13 in the Glass Bowl 
Cincinnati notched a school bowl game record in first downs (33), total plays (91), held BC to 164 total yards (87 passing, 77 rushing) a miserly 0–11 on third down conversions, and held the ball offense for 41:29. The Eagles scored zero points on offense and the Bearcats ran more plays in BC territory 51, than the Eagles ran for the whole game (44) With a school bowl record 4 touchdowns (3 Rushing, 1 Passing) Desmond Ridder was named game MVP. Senior TE Josiah Deguara finished his Bearcat career with 92 receptions, a school record for tight ends. The Bearcats won their 2nd consecutive bowl game for the first time since 2012 and finished with 11 wins for only the 4th time in school history. The Bearcats finished the season with 10+ wins for the 7th time in the previous 13 seasons and in the national ranking in back to back seasons for the first time since 2008–2009.

Personnel

Roster and staff

Depth chart

Rankings

Awards and milestones

Players drafted into the NFL

References

Cincinnati
Cincinnati Bearcats football seasons
Birmingham Bowl champion seasons
Cincinnati Bearcats football